Madame Pompadour is a 1927 British silent historical drama film directed by Herbert Wilcox and starring Dorothy Gish, Antonio Moreno and Nelson Keys. The film depicts the life of Madame Pompadour, mistress of Louis XV of France. It was the first film to be shot at the newly christened Elstree Studios.

Plot
In 18th-century France, the King's mistress  Madame Pompadour (Dorothy Gish), frees her jailed lover, political prisoner Rene Laval (Antonio Moreno), to make him her bodyguard.

Cast
 Dorothy Gish as Madame Pompadour 
 Antonio Moreno as Rene Laval 
 Nelson Keys as Duc de Courcelette 
 Henri Bosc as Louis XV 
 Gibb McLaughlin as Comte Maurepas 
 Cyril McLaglen as Gogo 
 Marsa Beauplan as Madame Poisson 
 Marie Ault as Belotte

Production
Gish and Wilcox had just enjoyed a big hit with Nell Gwyn. British National Pictures and Paramount signed them to make three more movies of which this was the first.

Gish was paid £1500 a week for six weeks. Filming was delayed an extra three weeks and this added a large amount to the budget and almost brought the film to a standstill.

Wilcox was paid £3000 for a film plus 25% of the profits but there were none.

Critical reception
Allmovie wrote, "Dorothy Gish's screen vehicles for British director Herbert Wilcox were usually a treat, but her 1927 film Madame Pompadour tended to be weighed down by the ponderous stylistic choices of its producer, Germany's E. A. DuPont....Madame Pompadour was an especially lavish and handsome production. Unfortunately, despite its brief 75-minute running time, the film moved at a snail's pace."

References

External links

1927 films
1920s historical drama films
British silent feature films
Films shot at British International Pictures Studios
1920s English-language films
Films directed by Herbert Wilcox
Films based on operettas
Cultural depictions of Louis XV
Cultural depictions of Madame de Pompadour
British black-and-white films
Films with screenplays by Frances Marion
British historical drama films
Paramount Pictures films
Films scored by Leo Fall
1927 drama films
1920s British films
Silent historical drama films